Gomphocarpus physocarpus, commonly known as hairy balls, balloonplant, balloon cotton-bush, bishop's balls, nailhead, or swan plant, is a species of dogbane. The plant is native to southeast Africa, but it has been widely naturalized.  It is often used as an ornamental plant.

Description

Gomphocarpus physocarpus is an undershrub perennial herb, that can grow to over six feet. The plant blooms in warm months. It grows on roadside banks, at elevations of 2800 to 5000 feet above sea level. The plant prefers moderate moisture, as well as sandy and well-drained soil and full sun.

Gomphocarpus physocarpus is traditionally used to produce ointments for the treatment of warts and the seeds are used in rituals. The leaves and stems produce milky latex that is toxic, yet it has never been described in detail particularly with regards to the anatomy of lactiferous cells.

The flowers are small, with white hoods and about 1 cm across.  The follicle is a pale green, and in shape an inflated spheroid.  It is covered with rough hairs.  It reaches three inches in diameter.  The leaves are light green, linear to lanceolate and 3 to 4 inches long, 1.2 cm broad.  The brown seeds have silky tufts.

This plant will readily hybridize with Gomphocarpus fruticosus creating intermediate forms.

Ecology
Gomphocarpus physocarpus is a food of the caterpillars of Danaus butterflies, including the monarch butterfly.

References

External links

Asclepias physocarpa photos
USDA Plants Profile

physocarpus
Butterfly food plants
Flora of Africa
Garden plants of Africa